Paulino do Livramento Évora (22 June 1931 – 16 June 2019) was a Cape Verdean clergyman and the first Cape Verdean-born bishop of Cape Verde.

Early life
He was born in Praia, Cape Verde.

Career 
He joined the congregation of the Holy Fathers and on December 16, 1962, was ordained by Pope Paul VI. On April 21, 1975, he became the 33rd bishop of Santiago de Cabo Verde.

The bishop of Malanje, Eduardo André Muaca on June 1 bestowed the episcopal ordination, with Francisco Esteves Dias, OSB, Bishop of Luso (now Lwena) and Zacarias Kamwenho, Archbishop of Luanda.

On December 9, 2003, his diocese's areas were reduced to the Sotavento Islands as the Barlavento Islands became part of the Roman Catholic Diocese of Mindelo due to population growth.

One of the last projects of building churches in his diocese was Nossa Senhora de Fátima (Our Lady of Fatima) church in Milho Branco. He laid the foundation stone on May 10, 2009. It was opened three years later after he retired as bishop.

He remained bishop until July 22, 2009. He was succeeded by Arlindo Gomes Furtado. He died on 16 June 2019.

References

External links
Paulino do Livramento Évora at catholic-hierarchy.org 

1931 births
2019 deaths
20th-century Roman Catholic bishops in Cape Verde
21st-century Roman Catholic bishops in Cape Verde
People from Praia
Roman Catholic bishops of Santiago de Cabo Verde